James Dodds may refer to:

 James Dodds (artist) (born 1957), English artist
 James Dodds (diplomat) (1891–1975), British diplomat

See also
James Dodd (disambiguation)